Hans-Joachim "Aki" Watzke (born 21 June 1959, Marsberg, North Rhine-Westphalia) is a German businessman and football official. He is the CEO of Borussia Dortmund.

Background
Watzke watched his first games at the Rote Erde as a child, and has been a club member of Borussia Dortmund since 1996.

Business career
He earned a Master of Business Administration from the Paderborn University.

He founded and grew Watex, a company making safety clothing, with sales of EU15-20m and 45 employees.

Work at Borussia Dortmund
He became treasurer of Borussia Dortmund in 2001.

In 2005, at the climax of the club's financial crisis, he was appointed chief executive officer. Alongside chairman Reinhard Rauball and CFO Thomas Treß, Watzke is credited with having saved the club from bankruptcy. He restructured and streamlined the club, made rigid cost cuts, and operated a clear financial plan. A 20% pay cut was made for all players. In 2006, in order to reduce debt, the Westfalenstadion was renamed "Signal Iduna Park" after a local insurance company (the naming rights agreement runs until 2031).

Other
Watzke is a member of the Christian Democratic Union.

References

External links
 Borussia Dortmund GmbH & Co. KGaA

1959 births
Living people
German football chairmen and investors
People from Marsberg
Paderborn University alumni